Allocreadium isoporum is a species of Trematoda belonging to the family Allocreadiidae. It is native to Europe and Northern America.

References

Trematoda